DWLL (94.7 FM), broadcasting as Mellow 94.7 is a radio station owned and operated by FBS Radio Network. The station's studio and transmitter are located at Unit 908, Paragon Plaza Building, EDSA, Mandaluyong. It broadcasts daily from 6:00 AM to 10:00 PM on terrestrial radio and 24/7 online.

History

1973–2006: Mellow Touch 94.7
The station began its broadcast in 1973 (when the Philippines was under Martial Law) as WLL 94.7, or Mellow Touch 94.7, as the Philippines' pioneering easy listening/soft adult contemporary station that only relied on spinners and a newscaster in its programming.  While most FM radio stations' format at the time was predominantly strident, Mellow Touch capitalized on a "more music, less talk" programming strategy. This formula proved to be successful as other radio stations followed suit after the fact. It has, since, established itself as the station for relaxing and feel-good music.

At that time, their studios were located at the now-demolished Philippine Communications Center building (PHILCOMCEN) in Pasig City.

Former DWBL disc jockey Butch Gonzales provided pre-recorded voiceovers to bridge segues between songs and to serve the purpose of occasional time-checks, usually at the "Top" and "Bottom" of certain hours of each day. Gonzales' voice also became the Mellow Touch's signature voice, as he softly reminded the loyal listeners of tunes for "a walk in the park" or "a bike ride along the boulevard", every hour as the station ID and jingle played. The sound of his voice would gradually transition to “natural,” soft and sentimental music that was clearly associated with this FM station at the time. The station's top of the hour ID became one of the most recognizable radio anthems on Philippine FM radio. The jingle, with the lyrics, "You are the minstrel... and I your guitar…", was produced by Dallas-based TM Studios (formerly TM Productions). The lyrics from this radio branding image were specifically customized and altered to meet Mellow Touch’s programming philosophy, called  "The Mellow Sound.” The jingle would then to become the station's most iconic trademark.

On November 1996, in a groundbreaking move, the station instituted a major reformat by accommodating on-air jocks.  Scott Free (Drew Domingo in real life, who is currently the Station Manager), Harry Maze (Harry Corro), Ted Bear (Renan Baluyut), and Riz Taylor (Ariz Peter Fuentez), were the first deejays to go on board. Ruth Cabal (formerly of GMA News, now on CNN Philippines) became one of its first lady newscasters, replacing long-time newscaster Ernie Fresnido.  Despite the emergence of deejays in its programs, the station maintained its programming objective of “more music, less talk” to this day.

Among its most notable programs were Mellow Midweek, a Thursday special that featured the station's greatest love songs from the 70s, 80s, and 90s; and Straight From The Heart, a Sunday special that highlighted its classic easy listening staples from the 70s and 80s. These two specials, considered as benchmark classics, became famous for their characteristic style of playing songs consecutively (usually for an hour) that have the same theme or words in the title, thus evoking an interaction in between songs. Avid listeners call this signature style as "sagutan" in Filipino.  Other noteworthy specials included Planet Soul, a Friday night program that played classic urban music from the 70s, 80s and 90s; Extreme, a Saturday night program that aired upbeat music from the 70s and 80s; and Afternoon Cruise, a weekday afternoon special that played acoustic music and featured live artists' performances.

In 1998, Mellow Touch 94.7 transferred its studios from PHILCOMCEN Building in Pasig to the Paragon Plaza Building in Mandaluyong to share facilities with sister stations DWBL 1242 and DWSS 1494, Magic 89.9, 99.5 RT (now 99.5 Play FM) and 103.5 K-Lite.

2006–Present: Mellow 947
In mid-2006, to emphasize the shift in programming, it changed its brand to Mellow 947 ("ninety-four-seven"), dropping the "Touch" brand from the network and switched to an Adult Top 40 format. This “repositioning” move now carries a new slogan called "Sounds Good" as it continues its adherence to playing good music. Its programs now generally aim to bring out the mellow side of pop-alternative and light rock music fans. Since then, the station has enjoyed success amidst the change in the radio landscape and it is this change that Mellow 947 is riding up on today. It also opened its doors to student DJs via the School of Jocks, which lasted until February 2020. Among its special programs were Sunday in Time, a Sunday program that featured songs from the 70s and 80s; Decade, a Thursday program that played songs from the 90s; Turn of the Century, a Sunday program that featured songs from the 2000s; and Nice & Slow, a Sunday night program that aired easy-listening music.

At the start of 2019, the 90s were added to its standard playlist, thus, expanding its format. Along with the reorganization of its programs, the station adopted another slogan, "All Hits," as it focuses on "less talk, less commercials and more music". On July 6, 2019, it also brought back Straight From The Heart, a weekend program that plays easy listening music from the 70s through the 90s, similar to the format used during the Mellow Touch era. On November 18, 2020, it launched Mellow Midweek Special (frequently abbreviated as MMS, named after its old program), a Wednesday program that plays upbeat music from the 70s through the 90s.

In 2021, it finally brought back its easy listening/soft adult contemporary format. On February 23, 2022, right on its 49th anniversary, it launched its official TikTok account. Since October 13, 2022, the former station jingle "The Mellow Sound" is played as its top-of-the-hour jingle.

On February 2023, Mellow 94.7 celebrated its 50th golden year with the theme "Celebrating 50 Golden Years of Mellow Music."

References

External links
 
Listen Live 1
Listen Live 2

Adult contemporary radio stations in the Philippines
FBS Radio Network
Radio stations in Metro Manila
Radio stations established in 1973
1973 establishments in the Philippines